A pig's trotter, also known as a pettitoe, or sometimes known as a pig's foot, is the culinary term for the foot of a pig. The cuts are used in various dishes around the world, and experienced a resurgence in the late 2000s.

Description

Before sale, the trotters are cleaned and typically have the hairs pulled with a hot tank and beaters. They are often used in cooking to make stocks, as they add thickness to gravy, although they are also served as a normal cut of meat.
In Puerto Rico, a tomato-based stew of pigs' trotters with chickpeas is called patitas de cerdo. Sometimes potatoes or butternut are added.
Chef Marco Pierre White has long served trotters at his restaurants, based on the original recipe of mentor Pierre Koffmann. In the New York City restaurant Hakata Tonton, 33 of the 39 dishes served contain pigs' trotters.

Following the late-2000s financial crisis, there has been a boom in popularity of pigs' trotters in the United Kingdom as a revival in cheap meat recipes occurred. In 2008, British supermarket Waitrose reintroduced trotters to its stores, and found that they quickly became popular. In 2009, Pierre Koffmann set up a pop-up restaurant, and found that diners ate an entire month's stock of 500 pigs' trotters in less than a week.

In Norwegian tradition, pigs' feet are salted and boiled and served as syltelabb. This is a pre-Christmas dish because the pig was slaughtered before Christmas, and everything was used. Today syltelabb is for enthusiasts.

Recipes and combinations

Bean crock (les pais au fou) in Jersey, Channel Islands
Cappello da prete in Modena, Italy
Chispalhada in Portugal: trotter with chickpeas or beans
Cotechino in Modena, Italy
Körömpörkölt in Hungary
Crubeens in Ireland
Pied de cochon in Sainte-Menehould, France
Tebichi in Okinawa, Japan
Tom tin moo in Laos
Crispy pata, Paksiw na pata, and patatim in the Philippines
Zampone in Modena, Italy
Manitas de cerdo in Spain
Jokbal in Korea
Souse in Barbados and St. Vincent and the Grenadines 
Spitzbein or Pfoten in German, known as golonka in Polish
Syltelabb is a traditional Norwegian dish
Inkokta grisfötter is a traditional Swedish dish similar to the Norwegian
Kha mu, lit. "pigs' feet" in Thailand influenced by Chinese stewed pork
 Patitas con maní and Sarza de patitas in Peru
Peus de porc in Catalonia

See also
Cow's trotters
 Sheep's trotters
Offal
Pickled pigs feet
Pork

References

External links

 Pig’s Feet with Ginger in Black Vinegar (Chinese cuisine) 

 
Cuts of pork
Foot
Offal
Soul food
African-American cuisine
Cuisine of the Southern United States